Maa is a 1976 Indian Bollywood family drama film directed by M. A. Thirumugam and produced by Sandow M.M.A. Chinnappa Devar. It stars Dharmendra and Hema Malini in pivotal roles. It was remade in Tamil as Annai Oru Aalayam (1979).

Synopsis

Vijay lives with his mother in a palatial house deep in the jungles in South India where he makes a living trapping animals for circuses, zoos - both nationally and internationally.
He meets a beautiful U.S.-returned Nimmi, who is the daughter of Vijay's exclusive animal buyer. 
They both fall in love with each other and want to get married. Vijay's mother cautions them both against separating new-born animals from their birth mothers, but both refuse to listen. 
Then the unexpected happens, a mother lioness, angered at Vijay for taking her cubs, attacks him, and leaves him badly wounded. With the help of his mother, and Nimmi, Vijay recovers and despite his recent attack and his mother's warning, he again goes to trap animals - this time a baby elephant for a circus. 
He manage to trap the elephant in a pit, but the angered mother elephant pursues them, even after they transport it in a truck. Her maternal and protective instincts come to the foreplay, she overtakes the truck, dismantles it, but is chased away by Vijay and his employees. 
She turns to attack Vijay, but his mother intervenes - and is instantly attacked and crushed. Holding his mother in his arms, Vijay swears to hunt the elephant as well as all other animals and kill them one by one, but his dying mother makes him promise that he will not do so.
Vijays mom tells him to instead return all cubs to their parents, as well as the baby elephant. Vijay promises to do so, and his mother passes away. Vijay is devastated, in heart-wrenching sorrow & pain, he calls out to his mother, and carries out her promise. He releases all trapped animals, and returns the cubs to the jungle. But returning the baby elephant, Ganesh, is another issue altogether as it has been transported to the city, and must be brought back. When Vijay goes to bring it back, he finds out that the truck had broken down, the elephant had escaped and is loose in the city. He desperately goes around looking for it. In the meantime back home, the mother elephant is on a rampage, enraged at being separated from her child, it crushes vegetation, attacks villagers, and tears down their dwellings. And the next target that looms before it is none other than Vijay's beloved - Nimmi.

Cast 
 Dharmendra as Vijay
 Hema Malini as Nimmi
 Nirupa Roy as Vijay's Mother
 Om Prakash as Gopaldas (Nimmi's Father)
 Ranjeet as Balraj
 Padma Khanna as Balraj's Girlfriend
 Paintal as Vijay's Employee
 Brahmachari as Vijay's Employee

Soundtrack 
Lyricist: Anand Bakshi

References

External links 

1970s Hindi-language films
1976 films
Films scored by Laxmikant–Pyarelal
Hindi films remade in other languages
Films directed by M. A. Thirumugam